Edoardo Righi (13 October 1926 - 8 August 2019) was an Italian long-distance runner, who was 8th in the marathon at the 1958 European Athletics Championships.

Two-time national champion at senior level.

National records
 Marathon: 2:26:52 ( Stockholm, 24 August 1958) - record holder until 28 October 1962.

Achievements

See also
 Men's marathon Italian record progression
 Italy at the 1958 European Athletics Championships

References

External links
 

1926 births
2019 deaths
Italian male long-distance runners
Italian male marathon runners
Sportspeople from the Province of Avellino